East Torrens was an electoral district of the House of Assembly in the Australian state of South Australia from 1857 to 1902 and again from 1915 to 1938.

East Torrens was also the name of an electoral district of the unicameral South Australian Legislative Council from 1851 until its abolition in 1857, George Waterhouse (July 1851 to June 1854), Charles Fenn (June 1854 to August 1855) and John Bristow Hughes (September 1855 to February 1857) being the members.

Members

References 

Former electoral districts of South Australia
1857 establishments in Australia
1902 disestablishments in Australia
1915 establishments in Australia
1938 disestablishments in Australia